Jan Bochenek (20 September 1931 – 2 November 2011) was a Polish weightlifter. He competed at the 1956 and 1960 Olympics and finished in fourth and third place, respectively. He also won two bronze medals at the world championships of 1957 and 1959.

References

External links

 
 
 
 

1931 births
2011 deaths
Polish male weightlifters
Olympic weightlifters of Poland
Weightlifters at the 1956 Summer Olympics
Weightlifters at the 1960 Summer Olympics
Olympic bronze medalists for Poland
Olympic medalists in weightlifting
Sportspeople from Ivano-Frankivsk
People from Stanisławów Voivodeship
Medalists at the 1960 Summer Olympics
World Weightlifting Championships medalists
21st-century Polish people
20th-century Polish people